Eusebio Sacristán Mena (born 13 April 1964), known simply as Eusebio in his playing days, is a Spanish professional football manager and former player who played as a central midfielder.

He had a 20-year playing career, which started and ended at Real Valladolid, and won an array of domestic and European silverware in his seven seasons at Barcelona. Internationally, he represented Spain at Euro 1988.

Eusebio began his coaching career at Barcelona and went on to lead Celta, Barcelona B, Real Sociedad and Girona.

Playing career

Club
Born in La Seca, Province of Valladolid, Eusebio started playing professionally with hometown's Real Valladolid, being an automatic first-choice from an early age and moving to Atlético Madrid for 1987–88. After that sole season in Madrid he joined FC Barcelona, proceeding to be one of coach Johan Cruyff's most used squad members in the subsequent years – he played the full 90 minutes at both the victorious 1989 Cup Winners' Cup and the 1992 European Cup Finals.

Eusebio could only manage 36 appearances in his last two seasons combined, this prompting a move to RC Celta de Vigo in 1995 where he posted two more solid campaigns. He retired in 2002 at the age of 38 with Valladolid, having played 543 La Liga matches (the only division he competed in after being promoted to his first club's first team), third-best in the competition only behind Andoni Zubizarreta and Raúl.

International
Eusebio earned 15 caps for Spain, the first coming on 24 September 1986 in a friendly match with Greece, in Gijón. He was subsequently picked for the final squad at UEFA Euro 1988, collecting no appearances as the national team exited in the group stage in West Germany.

Coaching career
Upon retiring, Sacristán opened a football school in Valladolid for 6-to-12-year-old children. He also obtained his coaching degree and, from 2003 to 2008, was part of Frank Rijkaard's staff at Barcelona.

On 2 March 2009, Eusebio was named head coach of another former club, Celta, as the Galician side struggled in the second division. The following season was not any better, as although the team eventually retained their division status with ease they struggled until the last month of competition; he was let go when his contract expired in June 2010.

Eusebio returned to Barcelona for 2011–12, being appointed the B team's manager after Luis Enrique left for A.S. Roma. He led them to the third position in his third year; on 9 February 2015, however, following a string of poor results, he was relieved of his duties and was replaced by youth coach Jordi Vinyals.

On 9 November 2015, Eusebio was named manager of top flight club Real Sociedad after the dismissal of David Moyes. On 18 March 2018, he was himself fired.

On 7 June 2018, after three months without a club, Eusebio was appointed as manager of Girona FC, replacing Sevilla FC-bound Pablo Machín.

Personal life
At the end of 2020, Eusebio suffered a severe cranial injury from a fall in Valladolid, and was placed in an induced coma.

Managerial statistics

Honours

Club
Barcelona
La Liga: 1990–91, 1991–92, 1992–93, 1993–94
Copa del Rey: 1989–90
Supercopa de España: 1991, 1992, 1994
European Cup: 1991–92
UEFA Cup Winners' Cup: 1988–89
UEFA Super Cup: 1992

Valladolid
Copa de la Liga: 1984

International
Spain U21
UEFA European Under-21 Championship: 1986

Individual
La Liga Manager of the Month: February 2016, November 2016

See also
 List of FC Barcelona players (100+ appearances)
 List of La Liga players (400+ appearances)

References

External links

Real Sociedad official profile

FC Barcelona profile

1964 births
Living people
Sportspeople from the Province of Valladolid
Spanish footballers
Footballers from Castile and León
Association football midfielders
La Liga players
Real Valladolid Promesas players
Real Valladolid players
Atlético Madrid footballers
FC Barcelona players
RC Celta de Vigo players
Spain under-21 international footballers
Spain under-23 international footballers
Spain international footballers
UEFA Euro 1988 players
Spanish football managers
La Liga managers
Segunda División managers
RC Celta de Vigo managers
FC Barcelona Atlètic managers
Real Sociedad managers
Girona FC managers
FC Barcelona non-playing staff